The Stewart-Woolley House is a historic house in Kanab, Utah. It was built in 1872 for Levi Stewart, who converted to the Church of Jesus Christ of Latter-day Saints with his family in Illinois in 1837. Stewart moved to Kanab in 1870, where he first stayed in an old fort. He built his house shortly after, and it was designed in the Gothic Revival and Late Victorian styles. Stewart served as the local bishop. The house was acquired by Edwin D. Woolley, a native of Nauvoo, Illinois, in 1889. Woolley had two wives, Emma Geneva Bentley, with whom he had twelve children, and Flora Ashby Snow, with whom he had nine children. He lived in this house with his first wife, Emma, and their children, including Mary E. Woolley Chamberlain, who served as the mayor of Kanab from 1911 to 1913. The house has been listed on the National Register of Historic Places since April 6, 2001.

References

National Register of Historic Places in Kane County, Utah
Gothic Revival architecture in Utah
Victorian architecture in Utah
Houses completed in 1872
1872 establishments in Utah Territory